Vulcan, Son of Giove (Vulcano, figlio di Giove) is a 1962 Italian fantasy-adventure film directed and co-written by Emimmo Salvi in his directorial debut.  At the time of his death in 1989 he was preparing a film on Zeus. The film is also known as Vulcan, Son of Jupiter (American TV title). The film was partly shot in Iran.

Plot summary 
Following a dispute between Jupiter and Mars the latter ascends to Earth. Together with Venus he instructs the Thracians how to erect a castle which is supposed to become more beautiful than Mount Olympus. Jupiter assigns Vulcan and Etna to find Mars. Eventually the Thracians capture Etna and torture her. Vulcan saves her life and incites the slaves of the Thracians into an uprising. Mars and Venus try to return to Olympus but Jupiter sends Vulcan back to Earth to be with Etna.

Cast 
Bella Cortez as Etna
Iloosh Khoshabe as Vulcan (billed as Rod Flash Ilush)
Roger Browne as Mars
Annie Gorassini as Venus
Furio Meniconi as Jupiter
Gordon Mitchell as Pluto
Omero Gargano as Neptune
Isarco Ravaioli as Mercurius
Liliana Zagra as Nymph
Salvatore Furnari as Geo the midget
Ugo Sabetta as Milos, King of the Thracians 
Edda Ferronao as Erida, Goddess of Hate  
Yonne Scirè as Juno - Jupiter's Wife  
Amedeo Trilli
Paolo Pieri

Reception
The film's romantic scenes have been dismissed as lacking chemistry.

References

Biography

External links 

1962 films
Italian fantasy adventure films
1960s action films
1960s fantasy adventure films
1960s Italian-language films
Peplum films
Films based on classical mythology
Films set in classical antiquity
Films set in ancient Greece
Greek and Roman deities in fiction
Films scored by Marcello Giombini
Sword and sandal films
1962 directorial debut films
Vulcan (mythology)
1960s Italian films